Cecilia Monti (1710- died after 1737), was an Italian opera singer of Roman origin who was active in Italy and central Europe ca. 1726-37. She is known to be the first soprano to play the part of Rosalba in La pravità castigata (1730), an opera performed in Prague that was the first 18th-century opera based on the Don Juan legend. She usually appeared in comic roles with her partner, the Venetian bass Bartolomeo Cajo.

References 

 Freeman, Daniel E. The Opera Theater of Count Franz Anton von Sporck in Prague.  Stuyvesant, N.Y.: Pendragon Press, 1992. A list of her roles is provided on pp. 306–7.
 Starší divadlo v českých zemích do konce 18. století. Osobnosti a díla, ed. A. Jakubcová, Praha: Divadelní ústav – Academia 2007
 http://encyklopedie.idu.cz/index.php/Monti,_Cecilia

1710 births
18th-century Italian women opera singers
Year of death unknown